Route 118 is a  north-south state highway in Bristol County, Massachusetts. Its southern terminus is at U.S. Route 6 (US 6) in Swansea and its northern terminus is at Route 123 in Attleboro. Along the way it intersects US 44 in Rehoboth.

Route description
Route 118 begins at U.S. Route 6 just east of I-195's Exit 3. The route, which begins as Swansea Mall Drive, passes Swansea Mall and the Swansea Crossing shopping center before crossing Wood Street and turning into Oak Street. At the end of Oak Street, Route 118 turns onto Locust Street briefly before turning onto Plain Street and entering Rehoboth.

In Rehoboth, the route heads northward, turning shortly westward along Brook Street before turning north on Moulton Street, which turns into Bay State Road near the town center before crossing U.S. Route 44. Route 118 then becomes Anawan Street, passing northward until it meets Tremont Street in North Rehoboth. The route then turns westward before bearing northwestward on Park Street into Attleboro. Park Street passes through Briggs Corner and passing the Shrine of Our Lady of La Salette, known for its massive display of Christmas lights. The route then splits between Park Street (Southbound) and Emory Street (Northbound). The southbound side passes Sturdy Memorial Hospital and the City Hall before both streets end at Route 123, just east of the main rail route between Boston and Providence.

Major intersections

References 

118
Transportation in Bristol County, Massachusetts